The First Congregational Church and Parish House in Memphis, Tennessee are a historic church and parish house on a single lot at 234 S. Watkins Street.  The Georgian Revival-style church is a high one-story church which was built in 1910. It was added to the National Register of Historic Places in 1980.

It was deemed "significant both as a fine example of the Georgian Revival style and as the work of prominent Memphis architect Walk Claridge Jones, Sr.  A regional leader in the profession, Jones abhorred modem architecture, preferring instead a simplified classical style. The First Congregational Church, with its Ionic portico, rectangular plan and symmetrical fenestration, illustrates this philosophy."

References

Churches on the National Register of Historic Places in Tennessee
Georgian Revival architecture in Tennessee
Churches completed in 1910
Churches in Memphis, Tennessee
Congregational churches in Tennessee
National Register of Historic Places in Memphis, Tennessee